Columbia High School is a secondary school located in Columbia, Mississippi, United States. It is in Columbia School District.

The principal is Braxton Stowe.

Mascot: Wildcat
Colors: Blue & Gold

The architecture of the building is an example of European-inspired modernism, and was featured in the French architectural journal l'architecture d'aujourd'hui. It was built in 1937 as part of the Works Progress Administration.

Notable alumni
Ernest Duff (1931-2016), businessman, lawyer and Mormon bishop
Walter Payton, hall of fame former Chicago Bears running back who died in 1999, and the namesake for the Walter Payton Award
Gus Hunt, American cybersecurity expert, and former intelligence officer. He is the managing director and cyber strategy lead for Accenture Federal Services. He formerly served as the Chief Technology Officer for the Chief Information Officer at the Central Intelligence Agency (CIA).

References

External links

Education in Marion County, Mississippi
Public high schools in Mississippi
Works Progress Administration in Mississippi
1937 establishments in Mississippi
Columbia, Mississippi